Stacey Apfelbaum is a retired American rowing cox.

Apfelbaum is a graduate of Mount Holyoke College. She was the university's coxswain for three years before she joined the US National Team. She won a gold medal at the 1984 World Rowing Championships in Montreal, Canada, with the lightweight women's eight; this was the only year that this boat class competed at World Rowing Championships.

Apfelbaum is the head rowing coach at Niskayuna High School.

References

Year of birth missing (living people)
Living people
American female rowers
Coxswains (rowing)
World Rowing Championships medalists for the United States
Mount Holyoke College alumni
21st-century American women